The Seventh Survivor is a 1942 British spy war film directed by Leslie S. Hiscott and starring Austin Trevor, Linden Travers and John Stuart. It was produced by British National Films and Shaftesbury Films. Shot in 1941, it was released in January the following year. The film was made at the Riverside Studios in Hammersmith as a second feature. It was one of several British films of the time that take place predominantly on lighthouses including Tower of Terror and Sabotage at Sea.

Plot
During the Second World War, Sir Edward Norton of British Counterintelligence informs politician Goodenough that all he knows about a German spy in possession of vital information is that he or she is on the ship Santa Maria, bound for Lisbon. However, there is some good news; Sir Edward receives a coded message from the ship's captain, informing him that Lloyd Harrigan, one of his most resourceful agents, is also aboard. Despite being a neutral, the ship is torpedoed.

Six passengers make it to a lifeboat, three men (Robert Cooper, Thomas Pettifer and Toni Anzoni) and three women (Gillian Chase, Mrs. Lindley and Diane Winters). They pick up Oberleutnant Hartzmann, the commander of the now-sunk  U-boat, and soon after, reach a lighthouse manned by Sutton and his assistant Ernie. Hartzmann manages to send a message before disabling the wireless, and finds a pistol. Holding the others at gunpoint, he informs them that another U-boat will pick him up in about five hours. He also tells them that he sank their ship because he knew that both Harrigan and the German spy were passengers, and that, based on Harrigan's reputation, the spy would not have reached Lisbon. However, he does not know either person's cover identity. Nobody admits to being either agent. Eventually, Sutton obtains another gun and takes Hartzmann prisoner, handcuffing him and locking him in a room. However, someone passes the keys to Hartzmann's handcuffs and the door, and leaves a revolver outside. Hartzmann shoots the wireless Sutton has repaired and takes control again. Then Cooper turns up dead, struck in the head.

Finally, when Hartzmann announces the U-boat has arrived, Pettifer reveals he is the spy. However, Hartzmann then informs him he is Harrigan, not the unfortunate Cooper. British, not German, naval personnel take Pettifer away.

Cast 
 Austin Trevor as Captain Hartzmann
 Linden Travers as Gillian Chase
 John Stuart as Robert Cooper
 Frank Pettingell as Thomas Pettifer
 Martita Hunt as Mrs. Lindley
 Jane Carr as Diane Winters (listed in opening and ending credits as Diane Chase)
 Charles Goldner as Toni Anzoni
 Wally Patch as Sutton
 Ronald Shiner as Ernie
 Felix Aylmer as Sir Elmer Norton  
 Henry Oscar as Goodenough
 Ralph Truman as Ship's Captain

References

Bibliography
 Chibnall, Steve & McFarlane, Brian. The British 'B' Film. Palgrave MacMillan, 2009.

External links
 
 
 

1942 films
1940s war films
1940s English-language films
British black-and-white films
British spy films
British World War II propaganda films
Films directed by Leslie S. Hiscott
Seafaring films
Films shot at Riverside Studios